Teva Pharmaceutical Industries Ltd. (also known as Teva Pharmaceuticals) is an Israeli multinational pharmaceutical company with headquarters in Tel Aviv, Israel.  It specializes primarily in generic drugs, but other business interests include active pharmaceutical ingredients and, to a lesser extent, proprietary pharmaceuticals. Teva Pharmaceuticals was the largest generic drug manufacturer, when it was surpassed briefly by US-based Pfizer. Teva regained its market leader position once Pfizer spun off its generic drug division in a merger with Mylan, forming the new company Viatris at the end of 2020. Overall, Teva is the 18th largest pharmaceutical company in the world.

Teva's facilities are located in Israel, North America, Europe, Australia, and South America. Teva shares are listed on the Tel Aviv Stock Exchange. The company is a member of the Pharmaceutical Research and Manufacturers of America (PhRMA).

History

Salomon, Levin, and Elstein 
Teva's earliest predecessor was SLE, Ltd., a wholesale drug business founded in 1901 in Jerusalem, which at that time was part of the Ottoman Empire's Mutasarrifate of Jerusalem. SLE Ltd. took its name from the initials of its three cofounders: Chaim Salomon, Moshe Levin and Yitschak Elstein, and used camels to make deliveries. During the 1930s, new immigrants from Europe founded several pharmaceutical companies including Teva ("nature" in Hebrew) and Zori. In the 1930s, Salomon, Levin, and Elstein Ltd. also founded Assia, a pharmaceutical company.

Teva Pharmaceutical Industries

1935–1949 
Teva Pharmaceutical Industries took its present form through the efforts of Günther Friedländer and his aunt Else Kober on May 1, 1935. The original registration was under the name Teva Middle East Pharmaceutical & Chemical Works Co. Ltd. in Jerusalem, then part of Mandatory Palestine. Friedländer was a German pharmacist, botanist and pharmacognosist, who immigrated to Mandatory Palestine  in 1934, following the Nazi Party Rise to power.

The company was built with an investment of 4,900 pounds sterling, which came from the family's own capital and partly from loans from other German immigrants. Capital shortage led to the joining of the banker Alfred Feuchtwanger as a partner in Teva, who received 33% of the shares in return for his investment.

Friedländer's business philosophy opined that the pharmaceutical industry has a reliable basis in difficult economic times, since "A Jewish mother will always buy medicine for her children". In the Second World War, the company provided medicine to the allied forces and in particular to the British army present in the Middle East. After the war, Sir Alan Gordon Cunningham, the last of the High Commissioners for Palestine and Transjordan, visited Teva on behalf of the Secretary of State for the Colonies. His visit promoted Teva's reputation in the pharmaceutical market and created a momentum for Teva's development.

During the Second World War and until the termination of the British Mandatory Palestine regime, Teva exported its medical products to Arab countries. In 1941, Friedländer presented Teva products in an exhibition held in Cairo, Egypt. The exhibition was sponsored by the General Agent and Sole Distribution of medicine in Egypt and Sudan, Syria and Lebanon. Later on, Teva exported its products to the US, Soviet Union (USSR), health institutes in Denmark, Czechoslovakia, Persia and Burma.

1950–1999 
In 1951, Feuchtwanger initiated an initial public offering to raise capital through the newly founded Tel-Aviv Stock Exchange, and Teva became a public company. In 1954, Teva received a Certificate Excellence in Training award from the Israeli President, Yitzhak Ben Zvi. In 1964, Teva partnered with Sintex, a company from Mexico, and Schering Plough.

In 1964, Assia and Zori merged and in 1968 acquired a controlling stake in Teva. In 1976, the three companies merged into the modern-day Teva Pharmaceutical Industries Ltd. In 1980, Teva acquired Ikapharm, then Israel's second largest drug manufacturer.

In 1980, Teva acquired Plantex. 

In 1982, Teva was granted approval by the U.S. Food and Drug Administration (FDA) for its Kfar Saba manufacturing plant.

In 1995, Teva acquired Biogal Gyógyszergyár Rt. (Debrecen, Hungary) and acquired ICI (Italy).

2000s 
In 2000, Teva acquired Canada-based Novopharm.

In October 2003, Teva announced its intentions to acquire Sicor Inc. for $3.4 billion. Following the announcement, the acquisition was completed on January 22, 2004, which marked Teva's entry into biosimilars' market.

In 2005, Teva opened a new, state-of-the-art pharmaceutical manufacturing plant in Har Hotzvim, a technology park in Jerusalem. The plant received FDA approval in early 2007. Teva entered the Japanese market in 2005, and in 2008 established a generics joint venture with Kowa.

In January 2006, Teva acquired its U.S. rival Ivax Corporation for $7.4 billion. In 2008, sales totalled $11.08 billion, $13.9 billion in 2009, and in 2010 total sales rose to $16.1 billion, of which a major portion was in Europe and North America. On December 23, 2008, Teva acquired Barr Pharmaceuticals for $7.5 billion, making Barr and Pliva (which Barr bought earlier) part of Teva.

2010s 
On March 18, 2010, Teva said it planned to acquire German generic Ratiopharm for US$5 billion. The deal was completed in August 2010. In May 2011, Teva bought Cephalon for US$6.8 billion. The same month, Teva announced the ¥40 billion purchase of a majority stake in Japanese generic drug company Taiyo Pharmaceutical Industry, a move to secure a Japan-local production facility. Teva completed the $934 million acquisition in July 2011. In June 2013, Teva acquired US firm MicroDose Therapeutx for $40 million with as much as $125 million being paid in regulatory and developmental milestones  In 2010, Teva announced that it would build its main distribution center for the Americas in Philadelphia, PA, and was considering opening its US headquarters in the area. In 2010, it had 39,660 employees. In Israel, the number of workers rose 7.5% by 6,774. In March 2010, Teva acquired German-based company Ratiopharm in a deal worth almost $5 billion, significantly expanding its European coverage. In October 2010, Teva entered a licensing agreement with BioTime to develop and market BioTime's OpRegen for the treatment of age-related macular degeneration, an effort that in 2013 received $1.5 billion in funding from Israel's Office of the Chief Scientist.

In May 2011, Teva announced it would purchase Cephalon for US$6.8 billion.

In January 2014, Teva acquired NuPathe, after outbidding Endo, for $144 million. In June 2014, Teva acquired Labrys Biologics for up to $825 million, the aim being to strengthen the company's migraine pipeline through addition of LBR-101, an anti-CGRP monoclonal antibody therapeutic.

In March 2015, Teva acquired Auspex Pharmaceuticals for $3.5 billion growing its CNS portfolio. In April, Teva offered to acquire Mylan for $40 billion, only a fortnight after Mylan offered to buy Perrigo for $29 billion. Teva's offer for Mylan was contingent on Mylan abandoning its pursuit of Perrigo. Mylan stated in June 2015 that Teva's disclosure that it had a 1.35 percent stake in Mylan violated US antitrust rules. In October, the company acquired Mexico-based Representaciones e Investigaciones Medicas (Rimsa) for around $2.3 billion. In the same month Teva acquired Gecko Health Innovations. In November 2015, the company announced it would collaborate with Heptares Therapeutics with its work on small-molecule calcitonin gene-related peptide antagonists for migraine treatment, with the deal generating up to $410 million.

Teva Active Pharmaceutical Ingredients (TAPI) operates within Teva as a stand-alone business unit. In 2009, TAPI's sales to third parties totaled $565 million, and in 2010 sales rose by 13% to a total of $641 million.

In July 2017, it was reported that Pascal Soriot, CEO of AstraZeneca since 2012, would become the next CEO of Teva, succeeding Erez Vigodman, however this was soon refuted. As of August 2017, the company has struggled to attract a new CEO, leading to mounting questions for the board. In August 2017, the board of directors announced a 75% cut in the dividend, reflecting declining profitability, and the share price fell by almost half in the days following. As of September 11, 2017, Teva remained the “world’s biggest seller of generics medicines.” On September 11, 2017, it was reported that they had selected Kåre Schultz as the new Teva CEO. A day later the company announced it would sell its Paragard contraceptive brand to Cooper Cos for $1.1 billion, with the funds being used to pay down debt. Days later the company announced further divestments: a sale of contraception, fertility, menopause and osteoporosis products to CVC Capital Partners Fund VI for $703 million and its emergency contraception brands for $675 million to Foundation Consumer Healthcare. By December, the company had announced a drastic 25 percent workforce reduction (greater than 14,000 employees) as part of a two-year cost-reduction strategy. Following considerable lobbying by the Israeli Government, from whom Teva received considerable tax breaks, and from Israel's labor federation, the Histadrut, Teva agreed to delay some of the layoffs in Israel.

In October 2019, Teva faced criticism for making a “business decision to discontinue the drug” Vincristine, essential for the treatment of most childhood cancers according to the Food and Drug Administration.

Actavis Generics 

In July 2015, Allergan agreed to sell its generic drug business (Actavis Generics) to Teva for $40.5 billion ($33.75 billion in cash and $6.75 billion worth of shares). As a result, Teva dropped its pursuit of Mylan. In order for the deal to gain regulatory approval, Teva sold off a number of assets, including a portfolio of five generic drugs to Sagent Pharmaceuticals for $40 million, as well as a further eight medicines to Dr. Reddy's in a $350 million deal. Teva also sold a further 15 marketed generics, as well as three others that were close to market, for $586 million to Impax Laboratories. In July, Teva sold off a further 42 products to Australian generics company, Mayne Pharma, for $652 million; the deal moved Mayne up 50 spots, into the top-25 companies of US generic companies. As part of the deal Teva will seek to raise $20 to $25 billion through a bond sale.

After completing the $39 billion acquisition of Actavis Generics, Teva announced another, smaller, deal with Allergan, agreeing to acquire its generic distribution business Anda for $500 million.

2010s divestments 
On October 21, 2011, Par Pharmaceutical has sealed the deal to three products from Teva Pharmaceutical Industries, which the Israeli firm was required by the US Federal Trade Commission to divest before it could acquire US biotech Cephalon for $6.8 billion.

Following the acquisition of Allergan plc generic division some assets have sold off to meet US antitrust requirements. In June 2016 Indian pharmaceutical company Dr. Reddy's Laboratories Ltd bought 8 (ANDA) Abbreviated New Drug Applications for $350 million in cash. Also in June 2016 Teva sold two abbreviated new drug applications (ANDAs) to Indian pharmaceutical company Zydus Cadilla strengthen its US portfolio. On June 21, 2016, American pharmaceutical company Amneal Pharmaceutical previously known as Impax Laboratories bought a portfolio of generic drugs from Teva Pharmaceutical Industries for about $586 million. On July 29, Cipla an Indian pharmaceutical company bought three products from Teva. Indian pharmaceutical company, Aurobindo, was in the race to buy some Teva assets. In October 2016, Teva has sold off part of its UK and Ireland generic business to Indian pharmaceutical company Intas Pharma for 600 million pounds (5083 crore Indian rupees) in cash. In August 2016, Australia pharmaceutical company Mayne Pharmaceutical bought a portfolio of drugs from pharmaceutical giant Teva Pharmaceuticals last year for $845 million Australian dollars. In February 2018, Teva Pharmaceutical Industries Ltd has completed the sale of a portfolio of products within its global women's health business across contraception, fertility, menopause and osteoporosis for $703 million in cash to CVC Capital Partners Fund VI. Teva also agreed to sell its Plan B One-Step and its brands of emergency contraception to Foundation Consumer Healthcare for $675 million in cash. Combined annual net sales of these products were $140 million last year. It also sold Paragard to a unit of Cooper Companies Inc (COO.N) for $1.1 billion.

Acquisition history
The following is an illustration of the company's major mergers and acquisitions and historical predecessors (this is not a comprehensive list):

Corporate governance

Research and development

Teva holds patents on multiple drugs, including Copaxone, a specialty drug (for the treatment of multiple sclerosis), now the world's best selling MS drug, and Azilect (sold as Agilect in some countries) for treatment of Parkinson's disease. By July 2015, Copaxone held a "31.2 percent shares of total MS prescriptions in the United States." Teva's new 40 mg version of Copaxone taken three times a week "accounted for 68.5 percent of total Copaxone prescriptions in the United States." Copaxone accounts for about fifty percent of "Teva's profit and 20 percent of revenue." Competitors' Glatopa, 20 mg version of Copaxone, is taken once a day.

In June 2006, Teva received from the FDA a 180-day exclusivity period to sell simvastatin (Zocor) in the U.S. as a generic drug in all strengths except 80 mg. Teva presently competes with the maker of brand-name Zocor, Merck & Co.; Ranbaxy Laboratories, which has 180-day exclusivity for the 80 mg strength; and Dr. Reddy's Laboratories, whose authorized generic version (licensed by Merck) is exempt from exclusivity.

In June 2010, the company announced it would discontinue its production of propofol, a major sedative estimated to be used in 75% of all US anesthetic procedures.

In March 2015, Teva sold four anti-cancer compounds to Ignyta Inc. for $41.6 million. As part of the deal Teva sold the following compounds which were then renamed:
CEP-32496 (renamed RXDX-105) a small molecule inhibitor of BRAF, EGFR and RET, now in Phase I/II trials
CEP-40783 (renamed RXDX-106) a small molecule inhibitor of AXL and c-Met in preclinical development
CEP-40125 (renamed RXDX-107) a nanoformulation of a modified bendamustine with potential activity in solid tumours. Bendamustine Rapid Infusion as therapy for CLL and NHL is part of Teva's specialty drugs pipeline. 
TEV-44229 (renamed RXDX-108) a potent inhibitor of the kinase PKCiota

In July 2019, the company stopped production of Vincristine, a critical drug used to treat the most common forms of childhood cancer, and was criticized by media for creating a worldwide shortage of the drug. On 28 January 2020, the company announced that the Food and Drug Administration (FDA) had approved an autoinjector device for Ajovy (fremanezumab-vfrm) injection.

Legal issues
On June 25, 2010, Bayer sued Teva for falsely claiming that Teva's Gianvi was stabilized by betadex as a clathrate, and could consequently be advertised as a generic of Yaz The settlement resulted in Teva changing its product marketing to remove the claim that it used the same ingredients as Yaz. Bayer's method specifically prevents oxidative degradation of the estrogen, while Teva's does not.

In January 2015, the Supreme Court of the United States decided on the Copaxone patent in Teva Pharmaceuticals USA, Inc. v. Sandoz, Inc.

In December 2016, the attorneys general of 20 states filed a civil complaint accusing Teva of a coordinated scheme to artificially maintain high prices for a generic antibiotic and diabetes drug. The complaint alleged price collusion schemes between six pharmaceutical firms including informal gatherings, telephone calls, and text messages.

In January 2019, the Supreme Court of the United States decided for Teva in Helsinn Healthcare S.A. v. Teva Pharmaceuticals USA Inc.

On May 11 2019, Teva Pharmaceuticals USA was one of 19 drug companies sued for price fixing in the United States by 44 states for inflating its prices, sometimes up to 1000%, in an illegal agreement among it and its competitors. In June 2021, Teva agreed to pay $925M to settle allegations it had engaged in price fixing in Mississippi. In January 2022, Teva agreed to pay $425M to settle allegations that it had concealed price fixing practices from shareholders.

In May 2019, Teva Pharmaceuticals USA agreed to pay $85 million to the U.S. state of Oklahoma to settle allegations that it had been overprescribing opioids, marketing them as safe, and downplaying their addictive qualities.

In July 2019, Teva paid $69 million to settle pay-for-delay claims.

In 2021, New York Attorney General Letitia James filed a lawsuit against Teva and several other opioid manufacturers for their alleged contribution to the opioid epidemic in New York.

In February 2022, Teva agreed to a $225 million settlement with the state of Texas to end claims that it fueled an opioid epidemic in the state by improperly marketing pain medicine.

Pharmaceutical products

A full list of products destined for the US market is available from tevagenerics.com. Teva also manufactures generic medications for use outside of the US; Cyproterone acetate and Moclobemide being two examples.

Abacavir
Acetazolamide
Adderall (generic and branded)
Adrucil
Ajovy
Alprazolam
Amikacin Sulfate
Amitriptyline
Amoxicillin
Apri
Aripiprazole (generic)
Atazanavir (generic)
Atomoxetine
Atorvastatin
Augmentin (generic)
Austedo
Aviane
Azathioprine
Azithromycin
Baclofen
Balziva
Bisoprolol Fumarate
Bleomycin
Budeprion
Budesonide
Buspirone
Busulfan
Calcitriol
Camrese
Carboplatin
Cefdinir
Cephalexin
Ciclosporin
Ciprofloxacin
Citalopram
Cetirizine
Claravis
Clarithromycin
Clonazepam
Clozapine
Codeine
Copaxone
Cryselle
Cyclosporine
Daunorubicin
Dexmethylphenidate
Dextroamphetamine
Diazepam
Dihydrocodeine
Doxorubicin HCl
Emtricitabine/tenofovir
Epirubicin HCl
Eplerenon
Epoprostenol Sodium
Errin
Escitalopram
Estazolam
Estradiol
Etodolac
Famciclovir
Fentanyl
Filgrastim
Finasteride
Fiorinal
Flunitrazepam
Fluocinonide
Fluconazole
Fluoxetine
Fluvoxamine
Fremanezumab
Gabapentin
Galzin
Haloperidol
Haloperidol Decanoate
Hydroxychloroquine
Hydroxyzine Hydrochloride
Ibuprofen Max
Idarubicin HCl
Ifosfamide
Irinotecan
Gianvi
Irbesartan
Junel
Kariva
Kelnor
Lamotrigine
Laquinimod
Letrozole
Leucovorin Calcium
Levonorgestrel branded as Enpresse
Loperamide
Losartan
Lorazepam
Methotrexate
Methylphenidate
Minocycline
Mirtazapine
Mitoxantrone
Montelukast (generic) 
Naltrexone
Naloxone
Naproxen
Norepinephrine
Norethisterone
Nortrel
Nortriptyline
Nuvigil
Nystatin
Ocella
Olanzapine
Omeprazole
Optalgin
Oxycodone
Oxymorphone
Pantoprazole
Phentermine
Portia
Pravastatin
Pregabalin
Prednisolone
ProAir
Provigil
Quetiapine
QVAR
QNASL
Ramipril
Rasagiline
Salbutamol (Albuterol)
Sildenafil
Sertraline
Simvastatin
Sprintec
Sulfamethoxazole Trimethoprim
Sumatriptan
Tadalafil
Tamoxifen
Temazepam
Temozolomide
Tenofovir
Terbinafin
Testosterone
Tiagabine
Topiramate
Tramadol
Trazodone
Triethylenetetramine
Tri-Sprintec
Ursodiol
Valsartan
Verapamil
Velivet
Venlafaxine
Warfarin
Zolpidem
Zonisamide
Zopiclone

Recalls
In 2018, Teva Pharmaceuticals USA recalled tablets containing valsartan due to the detection of N-nitrosodiethylamine (NDEA) which is a probable human carcinogen.

See also
BioTime
Economy of Israel
Health care in Israel
Opioid epidemic in the United States
Science and technology in Israel
Teva Active Pharmaceutical Ingredients (TAPI)

References

External links

 Official website

Companies listed on the Tel Aviv Stock Exchange
Pharmaceutical companies of Israel
Pharmaceutical companies established in 1901
Generic drug manufacturers
Israeli brands
Life sciences industry
Companies based in Tel Aviv
Multinational companies headquartered in Israel
Social problems in medicine
Pharmaceutical companies based in New Jersey